Alavese Unity (Spanish: Unidad Alavesa) was a political party in the Basque Country based in the province of Álava, that existed between 1989 and 2005.

References

1989 establishments in the Basque Country (autonomous community)
2005 disestablishments in the Basque Country (autonomous community)
Political parties established in 1989
Political parties disestablished in 2005
Political parties in the Basque Country (autonomous community)
Organisations based in Vitoria-Gasteiz